Kiseh Jin (also Romanized as Kīseh Jīn; also known as Kesjīn, Kīsajīn, Kīsayīn, Kīsheh Jīn, and Kīsjīn) is a village in Abgarm Rural District, Abgarm District, Avaj County, Qazvin Province, Iran. At the 2006 census, its population was 213, in 55 families.

References 

Populated places in Avaj County